Golf Punk magazine was launched by Tim Southwell and John Dean through their Keep Yourself Nice Ltd company in 2004, after securing investment from initially Premier League footballers Michael Gray, Thomas Sørensen, Phil Babb, Jason McAteer and Stephen Wright, and then Genesis Investments (part of Chris Ingram's investment portfolio).

Overview
Steve Read was signed from the Conde Naste Magazine Group as creative director. Iestyn George (formerly NME and GQ features editor) was also part of the launch team, as was writer Gavin Newsham, who contributed largely to the initial creation of the magazine. Golf Punk quickly established itself as the alternative voice of golf, while also demonstrating huge love for the history of the game and unique 'honesty-first' culture of the sport. Sales rose from 14,000 in 2004 to around 22,018 in its heyday of 2006. With cover stars ranging from new kids on the block Ian Poulter and Paul Casey to more established legends such as Ernie Els and Sam Torrance).

Danny Crouch, former equipment editor, was appointed publisher in 2005. Southwell was named BSME Editor Of the Year in 2006 before he and Dean left the company in late 2006, quickly followed by Steve Read, Danny Crouch, Gavin Newsham and Iestyn George. Owen Blackhurst (a former work experience turned travel editor) was appointed editor from November 2006, receiving a Highly Commended honour from the BSMEs in the New Editor category. He was supported by Shaun McGuckian (former work experience turned GP website editor) who acted as deputy editor before succeeding Owen in April 2008. The magazine continued to grow with Dan Angel taking over as group creative director, Richard Lenton (formerly Sky Sports) as associate editor, Ben Cove - staff writer, Joe Lancaster - Travel, and Daniel Owen - Equipment as the core team.

Editions of the magazine later appeared in 14 countries, including Germany, Italy, Sweden, South Africa, China and Singapore.

In December 2008, JF Media were bought by Montpelier Group. A sister title, Football Punk, was launched, edited by Richard Lenton and Ben Cove, with Dan Angel in charge of design. They produced ten issues of the magazine, before the owning company went defunct and closed down the publishing company.

GolfPunk magazine was restarted in 2012 as a digital-only version by the original founders, Tim Southwell and John Dean. Shaun McGuckian returned as deputy editor for the digital magazine.

GolfPunkHQ.com was launched in July 2015.

Awards
Awards
Tim Southwell was named Editor Of The Year in 2006 at both the BSME (British Society of Magazine Editors) Awards, and IPA (Independent Publishers Awards).
Steve Read's Creative Direction won Golf Punk the 2006 Best Designed Fashion Pages award at Magazine Design Awards.

The digital version of Golf Punk won an award for Best New Website in September 2012 from CSS Design Awards.

GolfPunk won 'Team Of The Year' at the 2014 Digital Publishing Awards

Dissolution
In November 2010, JF Media, the publisher of Golf Punk went out-of-business after struggling with debts of more than $1 million.

Relaunch
In August 2012, Tim Southwell and John Dean, the original founders, joined with former editor, Shaun McGuckian, and relaunched Golf Punk as a digital-only magazine.

References

External links
 

Online magazines published in the United Kingdom
Sports magazines published in the United Kingdom
Defunct magazines published in the United Kingdom
Punk
Magazines established in 2004
Magazines disestablished in 2010
Online magazines with defunct print editions